Orycteropus is a genus of mammals in the family Orycteropodidae within Tubulidentata. The genus is known from Late Miocene to recent of Africa.

The only living species within Tubulidentata is the aardvark (Orycteropus afer).

Species 
Three species are recognized:
 Orycteropus afer  – aardvark – Palaeolithic to Recent of Africa
 † Orycteropus abundulafus 
 † Orycteropus crassidens  – Pleistocene of Kenya
 † Orycteropus djourabensis  – Early Pliocene to Early Pleistocene of Chad and Kenya

Other species previously assigned to Orycteropus are now classified in the genus Amphiorycteropus.

References

Further reading 
 

Orycteropodidae
 
Mammal genera
Mammal genera with one living species
Taxa named by Georges Cuvier